Pavlovice is name of several locations in the Czech Republic:
Pavlovice (Benešov District)
Moravecké Pavlovice
Slezské Pavlovice
Velké Pavlovice
Pavlovice u Kojetína
Pavlovice u Přerova
Bohdalice-Pavlovice